Bhojpur is a constituency of the Uttar Pradesh Legislative Assembly covering the city of Bhojpur in the Farrukhabad district of Uttar Pradesh, India.

Bhojpur is one of five assembly constituencies in the Farrukhabad Lok Sabha constituency. Since 2008, this assembly constituency is numbered 195 amongst 403 constituencies.

Election results

2022

2017
Bharatiya Janta Party candidate Nagendra Singh won in 2017 Uttar Pradesh Legislative Elections defeating Samajwadi Party candidate Arshad Jamal Siddiqui by a margin of 	34,877 votes.

References

External links
 

Assembly constituencies of Uttar Pradesh
Farrukhabad district